The 2014–15 Mittelrheinliga was the 59th season of the Mittelrheinliga, one of three state association league systems in the state of North Rhine-Westphalia, covering its southwestern part. It was the third season of the league as part of the fifth level of the German football league system.

League table 
The league featured five new clubs for the 2014–15 season with FC Hürth, SV Eilendorf, VfL Leverkusen, TSV Hertha Walheim and FC Bergheim 2000 promoted from the Landesliga Mittelrhein while no club had been relegated from the Regionalliga West.

Top goalscorers 
The top goal scorers:

References

External links 
 

2014–15 Oberliga
2014-15